Alper Bagceci (born 16 April 1984) is a German footballer who plays for Türkspor Neu-Ulm.

External links

Alper Bagceci at FuPa

1988 births
Living people
German footballers
SSV Ulm 1846 players
1. FC Heidenheim players
3. Liga players
Regionalliga players
Association football midfielders
Sportspeople from Ulm
Footballers from Baden-Württemberg